Pleasington is a civil parish in Blackburn with Darwen, Lancashire, England.  The parish contains 12 buildings that are recorded in the National Heritage List for England as designated listed buildings.   Of these, one is listed at Grade I, the highest of the three grades, one at Grade II*, the middle grade, and the others are at Grade II, the lowest grade.  Apart from the village of Pleasington, the parish is rural, and many of the listed buildings are farmhouses.  The other listed buildings are the parish church, an ice house, an entrance to Woodfold Park, and three bridges.

Key

Buildings

References

Citations

Sources

Buildings and structures in Blackburn with Darwen
Lists of listed buildings in Lancashire